Miss Colombia 2015 was the 63rd edition of the Miss Colombia pageant. It was held on November 16, 2015 in Cartagena, Colombia. 

At the end of the event, Ariadna Gutiérrez of Sucre crowned Andrea Tovar of Chocó as Miss Colombia 2016. She represented Colombia in Miss Universe 2016 and placed 2nd Runner-Up.

Results

Color keys 

  The contestant won in an International pageant.

  The contestant was a Finalist/Runner-up in an International pageant.

  The contestant was a Semi-Finalist in an International pageant.
  The contestant did not place.

Scores

Color keys 
  Miss Colombia 2015-2016
  1st Runner-up
  2nd Runner-up
  3rd Runner-up
  4th Runner-up
  Top 15

Specials Awards

Delegates 
23 delegates have been selected to compete.

References

External links
 Official site

Miss Colombia
2015 in Colombia
Colombia